Ilustrowany Kuryer Codzienny (Illustrated Daily Courier), abbreviated IKC or Ikac, was a Polish daily newspaper as well as a publishing house.  Founded in 1910 in Kraków by Marian Dąbrowski, under the Second Polish Republic IKC was the biggest publisher in the country, with its newspapers and magazines having a circulation of more than 400,000.

The company started with its flagship, the Ilustrowany Kuryer Codzienny daily, and over time more titles were added. IKC was the only Polish newspaper available daily across Europe; it had offices in main Polish cities (Warsaw, Poznań, Katowice, Wilno, Lwów, Gdynia) as well as several European capitals. During World War I its circulation was 125,000 and it was limited to the area of Austrian Galicia. In the 1920s, IKC grew, becoming Poland's most popular daily, read by some 1 million people.

In 1933, afternoon daily Tempo dnia was added. Other titles, published by the company were: 
 Światowid - a high class monthly magazine,
 Na szerokim świecie - addressed to the readers from countryside,
 Raz, dwa, trzy - sports weekly, 
 Tajny detektyw - criminal magazine,
 As - high-class weekly.

In the late 1930s, IKC employed some 1,000 people. In autumn 1939, following the Polish September Campaign, the company was closed by the Germans. The last issue of Ilustrowany Kuryer Codzienny appeared on 26 October 1939. The next day, the Germans replaced it with Krakauer Zeitung. Dąbrowski himself left Poland just before the war. He died in 1958 in Florida. His body was buried at Kraków's Rakowiecki Cemetery.

Sources
 Ilustrowany Kuryer Codzienny
 Ilustrowany Kuryer Codzienny

External links
 Scans of all copies of Ilustrowany Kuryer Codzienny, from 1925 to 1939, at Lesser Poland's Digital Library

Second Polish Republic
Newspapers established in 1910
Defunct newspapers published in Poland
Mass media in Kraków
Daily newspapers published in Poland